White Cloud Creek is a stream in Nodaway and Andrew counties in the U.S. state of Missouri. It is a tributary of One Hundred and Two River.

The stream headwaters arise in Nodaway County approximately 1.5 miles west of Pickering (at ) and flows south-southeast crossing under US Route 71 and Missouri Route 46 three miles west of Maryville. It then turns and flows to the south-southeast passing about 1.5 miles west of the community of Pumpkin Center.

White Cloud Creek was named after an Indian tribe of the same name.

See also
List of rivers of Missouri

References

Rivers of Andrew County, Missouri
Rivers of Nodaway County, Missouri
Rivers of Missouri